The Geelong Football Club, nicknamed the Cats, is a professional Australian rules football club based in Geelong, Victoria, Australia. The club competes in the Australian Football League (AFL), the sport's premier competition, and are the 2022 reigning premiers.

The club formed in 1859, making it the second oldest club in the AFL after Melbourne and one of the oldest football clubs in the world.

In the 1860s, Geelong participated in a series of Challenge Cup competitions, and was a foundation member of both the Victorian Football Association (VFA) in 1877 and the Victorian Football League (VFL) in 1897, now the national AFL. The club won the Western District Challenge Cup in 1875, a then-record seven VFA premierships between 1878 and 1886, and six VFL premierships by 1963, after which it experienced a 44-year waiting period until it won its next premiership, a Grand Final-record 119-point victory in 2007. Geelong won a further three premierships in 2009, 2011 and 2022.

Geelong play most of their home games at Kardinia Park (known for sponsorship reasons as GMHBA Stadium) and play the remainder at the Melbourne Cricket Ground. Geelong's traditional guernsey colours are white with navy blue hoops. The club's nickname was first used in 1923 after a run of losses prompted a local cartoonist to suggest that the club needed a black cat to bring it good luck. Geelong also field teams in other competitions; a reserves men's team in the Victorian Football League (VFL), a senior women's team in the AFL Women's (AFLW) and a reserves women's team in the VFL Women's (VFLW) competitions. The club's official team song and anthem is "We Are Geelong".

History

The history of the Geelong Football Club, began in 1859 in the city of Geelong, Australia, is significant as the club is the second oldest AFL club, is believed to be the fourth oldest football club in Australia and one of the oldest in the world and one of the most successful. Initially playing under its own rules, some of which, notably, were permanently introduced into Australian Football. It adopted the Laws of Australian Football in the early 1860s after a series of compromises with the Melbourne Football Club.

Geelong went on to play for most of its existence in the premier competitions, the first competition, the Caledonian Society Cup, a foundation club of both the Victorian Football Association (VFA) in 1877 and the Victorian Football League (VFL) in 1897., VFL and continues in the elite Australian Football League (AFL). The Cats have been the VFL/AFL premiers ten times, with four in the AFL era (since 1990) in 2007, 2009, 2011, and most recently, 2022, to be the most successful club over that period (sharing that title with Hawthorn). They have also won ten McClelland Trophies, the most of any AFL/VFL club.

Many of the club's official records before 1920 have disappeared.

Club identity and culture

Guernseys 

Geelong's traditional navy blue and white hooped guernsey has been worn since the club's inception in the mid-1800s. The design is said to represent the white seagulls and blue water of Corio Bay.

The team has worn various away guernseys since 1998, all featuring the club's logo and traditional colours.

Moniker 
Geelong has been nicknamed the 'Cats' since 1923. A run of losses prompted a local cartoonist to suggest that the club needed a black cat to bring it good luck.

Song: "We Are Geelong"
"We Are Geelong" is the song sung after a game won by the Geelong Football Club. It is sung to the tune of "Toreador" from Carmen. The lyrics were written by former premiership player John Watts. Only the first verse is used at matches and by the team after a victory. The song currently used by the club was recorded by the Fable Singers in April 1972.

 We are Geelong, the greatest team of all
 We are Geelong; we're always on the ball
 We play the game as it should be played
 At home or far away
 Our banners fly high, from dawn to dark
 Down at Kardinia Park.

 So! Stand up and fight, remember our tradition
 Stand up and fight, it's always our ambition
 Throughout the game to fight with all our might
 Because we're the mighty blue and white
 And when the ball is bounced, to the final bell
 Stand up and fight like hell!

Stadium and training facilities 
Geelong's administrative headquarters is its home stadium, GMHBA Stadium or also known as Kardinia Park. The club trains here during the season, however it also trains at its alternate training venue, Deakin University's Elite Sport Precinct. The latter features an MCG-sized oval and is used often by the club in the pre-season, when Kardinia Park is being used for other events.

Rivalries

Hawthorn 

The rivalry between Hawthorn and Geelong is defined by two Grand Finals: those of 1989 and 2008. In the 1989 Grand Final, Geelong played the man, resulting in major injuries for several Hawks players, Mark Yeates knocking out Dermott Brereton at the opening bounce; Hawthorn controlled the game, leading by approximately 40 points for most of the match; in the last quarter, Geelong almost managed to come from behind to win, but fell short by six points. In the 2008 Grand Final, Geelong was the heavily backed favourite and had lost only one match for the season, but lost by 26 points; Geelong then won its next eleven matches against Hawthorn over the following five years, under a curse, which was dubbed the "Kennett curse" which was attributed to disrespectful comments made by Hawthorn president Jeff Kennett following the 2008 Grand Final. It was later revealed that after the 2008 grand final, Paul Chapman initiated a pact between other Geelong players to never lose to Hawthorn again. The curse was broken in a preliminary final in 2013, after Paul Chapman played his final match for Geelong the previous week. Hawthorn went on to win the next three premierships. In 2016 Geelong again defeated Hawthorn in the qualifying final. In twenty matches between the two sides between 2008 and 2017, twelve were decided by less than ten points, with Geelong victorious in eleven of those twelve matches.

Collingwood 
In 1925, Geelong won their first flag over Collingwood. In 1930, Collingwood defeated Geelong in the grand final making it four flags in-a-row for the Pies. Geelong would later deny Collingwood three successive premierships in 1937, winning a famous grand final by 32 points.

The two sides played against each other in 6 finals between 1951 and 1955, including the 1952 Grand Final when Geelong easily beat Collingwood by 46 points. In 1953, Collingwood ended Geelong's record 23-game winning streak in the home and away season, and later defeated them by 12 points in the grand final, denying the Cats a third successive premiership.

Since 2007, the clubs have again both been at the top of the ladder and have met regularly in finals. Geelong won a memorable preliminary final by five points on their way to their first flag in 44 years. In 2008, Collingwood inflicted Geelong's only home-and-away loss, by a massive 86 points, but the teams did not meet in the finals. They would meet in preliminary finals in 2009 and 2010, each winning one en route to a premiership. They finally met again in a Grand Final in 2011, which Geelong won by 38 points; Geelong inflicted Collingwood's only three losses for the 2011 season.

Corporate

Sponsorship

Supporter base

Players and staff

Current playing list and coaches

Officials 
 President: Craig Drummond
 Vice President: Diana Taylor
 Chief Executive Officer: Steve Hocking
 General Manager – Football: Simon Lloyd

Club records

Premierships and awards

Win–loss record 

 Statistics are correct to end of 2022 season

Match records

Reserves team 

The Geelong reserves team began competing in the VFL Reserves competition with the league's other reserves teams from 1919. From 1919 to 1991 the VFL/AFL operated a reserves competition, and from 1992 to 1999 a de facto AFL reserves competition was run by the Victorian State Football League. The Geelong Football Club fielded a reserves team in both of these competitions, allowing players who were not selected for the senior team to play for Geelong in the lower grade. During that time, the Geelong reserves team won thirteen premierships (1923, 1924, 1930, 1937, 1938, 1948, 1960, 1963, 1964, 1975, 1980, 1981, 1982), the most of any club.

Since the demise of the AFL reserves competition, the Geelong reserves team has competed in the new Victorian Football League, having won three premierships in that time. Unlike all other Victorian AFL clubs, Geelong has never operated in a reserves affiliation with an existing VFL club, having instead operated its stand-alone reserves team continuously. The team is composed of both reserves players from the club's primary and rookie AFL lists, and a separately maintained list of players eligible only for VFL matches. Home games are played at GMHBA Stadium, with some played as curtain-raisers to senior AFL matches.

 Premierships (3): 2002, 2007, 2012
 Runners-ups (2): 2006, 2013
 Minor premierships (2): 2002, 2013
 Wooden spoons (1): 2005

AFL Women's team 
In 2017, following the inaugural AFL Women's (AFLW) season, Geelong was among eight clubs that applied for licenses to enter the competition from 2019 onwards. The club has also had a team in the second-tier VFL Women's league since 2017.

AFLW season summaries 

^ Denotes the ladder was split into two conferences. Figure refers to the club's overall finishing position in the home-and-away season.

VFLW season summaries 

† In 2019, the team captaincy rotated through the following 5 players: Kate Darby, Danielle Higgins, Jordan Ivey, Maddy Keryk, Amy McDonald.

Sources: Club historical data  and VFLW stats

See also

 Sport in Australia
 Sport in Victoria
 List of Geelong Football Club players, captains and coaches
 1963 Miracle Match

Notes

Footnotes
References

Bibliography

External links

 Official website of the Geelong Football Club
 Official AFL website
 Geelong Football Club Honour Roll – list of all Presidents, captains, coaches and Best & Fairest winners since 1879.

 
Australian rules football clubs established in 1859
Australian Football League clubs
AFL Women's clubs
Australian rules football clubs in Geelong
1859 establishments in Australia
Former Victorian Football League clubs